Der Penny-Markt auf der Reeperbahn (English: The Penny Market on the Reeperbahn) is a German documentary series by Markus Grün for Spiegel TV on the Penny Market on the Reeperbahn in Hamburg.

Plot 
The report is about the Penny market in St. Pauli, which was open daily until 11 p.m. Spiegel TV author Markus Grün documents the daily routine there, which was characterized by theft, drunkards, poverty and a lot of chaos.

Production 
The four-part report was shot in 2006 and first broadcast in January 2007 as part of the Spiegel TV on Sat.1. SpiegelTV published this again in 2020 on the web video portal YouTube under the format Spiegel-TV-Classics. The report received such a cult following that it became known that the series should be continued. On the night of November 23 to 24, 2021, the sequel was broadcast on Sat. 1.

The YouTube videos became very popular and parts of the videos were shared as memes.

Criticism 
The portrayals of intoxicated alcoholics and homeless people with the narrator's ironic comments have been criticized. Matthias Dell from Deutschlandfunk compared the documentary series with a "90-minute meme".

References 

German documentary television series
2000s documentary television series
2020s documentary television series
Der Spiegel
Sat.1 original programming
Films shot in Hamburg